The Dnipro 2012–13 season was Dnipro's twenty-second Ukrainian Premier League season, and their third season under manager Juande Ramos. They finished the season in fourth place, while also reaching the semifinal of the Ukrainian Cup and the Last 32 of the UEFA Europa League when they were eliminated by Basel.

Current squad
According to the club's official website  on February 9, 2013.

Out on loan

Transfers

Summer

In:

Out:

Winter

In:

 

Out:

Competitions

Ukrainian Premier League

Results summary

Results by round

Results

League table

Ukrainian Cup

UEFA Europa League

Play-off

Group stage

Knockout phase

Squad statistics

Appearances and goals

|-
|colspan="14"|Players away from the club on loan:

|-
|colspan="14"|Players who appeared for Dnipro who left the club during the season:

|}

Goal scorers

Disciplinary record

Team kit
These are the 2012–13 Dnipro Dnipropetrovsk kits.

|
|
|
|}

References

External links
 Official website

Dnipro Dnipropetrovsk
FC Dnipro seasons
Dnipro Dnipropetrovsk